Daniel Hondo (born 8 March 1982) is a former Zimbabwean cricketer and a current rugby union player.  He was a right-handed batsman and a right-arm medium-fast bowler who played for Mashonaland A. He was born in Harare. He plays rugby union as a centre.

Cricket career
Hondo made a single first-class appearance, during the 2001-02 Logan Cup, against Midlands. He scored 7 not out from the lower order in the first innings in which he batted, and seven from the opening order in the second innings. Hondo bowled two overs during the match, conceding 21 runs.

In December 2020, he was selected to play for the Southern Rocks in the 2020–21 Logan Cup.

Rugby career
Hondo turned to rugby in adult life (a sport he played alongside cricket at Churchill Boys High), and is currently the captain of the Zimbabwe rugby team.

He grew up playing rugby and cricket alongside his older brothers, Donald and Douglas (former Zimbabwe Test cricketer).

Although he represented Zimbabwe at age-group level in cricket, Daniel is better known as a rugby player, forming a formidable centre-pairing at Harare Sports Club with Zimbabwe rugby great John Ewing in his early 20s.

He was awarded a rugby scholarship at Hartpury College in the UK, where he excelled under Zimbabwean-born coach Liam Middleton, representing the British Universities Select Side (also coached by Middleton).

Upon graduation, he returned home to Zimbabwe to re-launch his professional career. He plays for Harare Sports Club, where he also helps with the coaching. Hondo is also an assistant coach for the  Sevens team, a team he represented with distinction on the IRB Sevens Circuit during his UK stay. He has since retired from 7s, but was last year appointed captain of the Zimbabwe Fifteens team, the Sables.

References

External links
Douglas Hondo at Cricket Archive 
HSC Rugby Profile

1982 births
Living people
Zimbabwean cricketers
Zimbabwean rugby union players
Rugby union centres